Martha A.Q. Curley (born November 14, 1952) is an American nurse. She is the Ruth M. Colket Endowed Chair in Pediatric Nursing at Children's Hospital of Philadelphia.

Early life and education
Curley was born on November 14, 1952 in Springfield, Massachusetts, US to an Italian father. She completed her Diploma in Nursing from the Springfield Hospital School of Nursing in 1973 and her Bachelor of Science degree at the University of Massachusetts Amherst in 1985. Following this, she completed her Master's degree in nursing from Yale University and her PhD from Boston College.

Career
Upon completing her formal education, Curley joined the faculty at the University of Pennsylvania School of Nursing. As an associate professor received a five-year $10M Research Project Grant Program from the National Heart, Lung, and Blood Institute for a multi-site clinical trial, "Sedation Management in Pediatric Patients with Acute Respiratory Failure Study." In 2010, Curley was honored with the Barbara J. Lowery D.S.O. Faculty Award for advancing nursing science through exemplary student mentorship. As a result of her research, Curley was inducted into the 2014 International Nurse Researcher Hall of Fame.

In 2016, Curley was elected a member of the National Academy of Medicine as someone who "demonstrated outstanding professional achievement and commitment to service." Two years later, he was appointed the Ruth M. Colket Endowed Chair in Pediatric Nursing at Children's Hospital of Philadelphia. During the COVID-19 pandemic, Curley was awarded UPenn's 2021 Drs. Vidyasagar and Nagamani Dharmapuri Award for Excellence in Pediatric Critical Care Medicine as an individual who displayed "sustained exemplary and pioneering achievement in the care of critically ill and injured infants and children."

References

External links

Living people
1952 births
People from Springfield, Massachusetts
University of Massachusetts Amherst alumni
Yale School of Nursing alumni
Boston College alumni
Members of the National Academy of Medicine
University of Pennsylvania faculty
American women nurses
American nursing administrators
21st-century American women